

Godwin Karol Marian von Brumowsky (26 July 1889 – 3 June 1936) was the most successful fighter ace of the Austro-Hungarian Air Force during World War I. He was officially credited with 35 air victories (including 12 shared with other pilots), with 8 others unconfirmed because they fell behind Allied lines. Just before the war ended, von Brumowski rose to command of all his country's fighter aviation fighting Italy on the Isonzo front.

Life before entry into air service
Godwin von Brumowski was born into a military family in Wadowice, Galicia (in present-day Poland). He attended the Imperial and Royal Technical Military Academy in Mödling near Vienna and graduated as a lieutenant commissioned into the 29th Field Artillery Regiment on 18 August 1910.

He was serving in the 6th Artillery Division as regimental adjutant and had just turned 25 years of age when war was declared against Serbia on 28 July 1914. He served on the Eastern Front against Russia, winning both a Bronze and Silver Medal for Bravery before transferring to air service in the Imperial and Royal Aviation Troops (k.u.k. Luftfahrtruppen).

Aerial service
He was posted to Fliegerkompagnie 1 (Flik 1) at Czernowitz, commanded by Hauptmann Otto Jindra, in July 1915; von Brumowski was thus initially assigned as an aerial observer on the Russian Front. His flight log describes him as 1.77 meters (5 feet 10 inches) tall, with blue eyes and light blond hair.

On 12 April 1916 Jindra and von Brumowski crewed one of the seven Austro-Hungarian planes that participated in bombing a military review attended by Czar Nicholas II. In the process, they shot down two of the seven Russian Morane-Saulnier Parasol two-seaters that attempted to drive them off.

On 3 July 1916 von Brumowski became a pilot with Flik 1, despite the defective vision in his right eye that he corrected with a monocle. In November, he transferred to Flik 12 on the Italian Front. He helped down an Italian Caproni bomber on 3 December. On 2 January he became an ace when he was victorious over an Italian Farman two-seater while piloting a Hansa-Brandenburg C.I. It is notable that von Brumowski became an ace while still flying two-seater craft basically unsuited for air-to-air combat.

The next month, when Flik 41J was established on the Italian Front as Austro-Hungary's first dedicated fighter squadron, von Brumowski was chosen to command it. He spent nine days in March flying four sorties with the Germans of Jagdstaffel 24 to learn German fighter tactics, before assuming his command. While here he met the Red Baron, Manfred von Richthofen; von Brumowski would later copy the baron's aircraft paint scheme for his own plane.

Brumowski continued amassing victories through May, ending the month with a total of eight. By now, he was flying a single-seat fighter, the Hansa-Brandenburg D.I. Although better suited for air-to-air combat than the C.1, it still suffered three major disadvantages: the pilot's vision was partially obstructed; the single machine gun was not synchronized to fire through the propeller arc, and it was a difficult craft to fly because it was easy to spin at any altitude. Aiming and firing a gun mounted above and ahead of the pilot was more difficult than simply aiming the airplane at the enemy and firing a synchronized gun.

As was customary with Austro-Hungarian units, Flik 41j had an assortment of aircraft types available. In June 1917 von Brumowski flew an Aviatik D.I with no combat success. The Austro-Hungarian Fliks were also hampered by a doctrine that tied them to escort of reconnaissance aircraft instead of freeing them to rove and hunt in the German fashion.

In July 1917 Flik 41J lost eleven of the D.I fighters in accidents; the Hansa-Brandenburg's nickname became "the flying coffin".

In August 1917 von Brumowski scored a remarkable streak of victories, being credited with 12 confirmed and 6 unconfirmed kills between 10 and 28 August. Two of these victories, on the 19th and 20th, were the result of a partial transition to a newer fighter plane, a German Albatros D.III with twin synchronized guns. On the 20th he scored once with the Albatros and twice with the Hansa-Brandenburg D.I. By the end of August the transition was complete; he would use the Albatros to score the rest of his victories.

On 9 October 1917 he shot down and burned an observation balloon for his 22nd victory; it was the first of five balloons he would down. His Albatros that day was painted all red, in emulation of von Richthofen, with the addition of mustard colored skulls on either side of the fuselage. This paint scheme would become characteristic of his aircraft until war's end.

On 1 February 1918 von Brumowski became involved in a fight with eight enemy fighters. Some of the 26 bullets striking his Albatros ignited the fuel tank built into the upper wing. He managed to land at his home field without serious injury, becoming a rare survivor of an in-craft fire. The fire ate the fabric off the upper wing and the inboard portions of the lower one, leaving only the scorched bare spars and struts of the wing roots.

Three days later, while flying another Albatros he fought eight English fighters and took multiple machine gun hits. With his wings breaking up he still managed to land, though the Albatros flipped over and was totally destroyed.

Brumowski fought on until 23 June 1918, when he was ordered on extended leave. His last successful fight was on 19 June; he scored his 35th victory and suffered 37 hits in his plane. He had flown 439 combat sorties, but his combat career was ended.

Also on 23 June he was invited by Generaloberst (Colonel-General) Ferdinand to make the customary mandatory application for Austria-Hungary's highest decoration, the Knight's Cross of the Military Order of Maria Theresa. Brumowski's reply:

Austria-Hungary's leading fighter ace never received his nation's highest award.

On 11 October even though he was still only a Hauptmann (Captain), he was named to command all Austro-Hungarian fighter squadrons on the Isonzo Front. World War I ended a month later.

Postwar career

The end of the war left von Brumowski at loose ends. After a spell in Vienna, he farmed his widowed mother-in-law's land in Transylvania for ten years. As a city dweller lacking the Hungarian language skills to communicate with his farm workers, he bore serious handicaps. He had little success.

Brumowski took the dissolution of the Austro-Hungarian Empire very hard. He indulged in hazardous pursuits, seeking the thrill of danger by racing automobiles about on the poor local roads, riding horses into exhaustion, hunting in the mountains. He threw parties, danced, swam, ice skated to distract himself. He finally left his wife and daughter and began a flying school in Vienna in 1930, and remarried.

During the early 1930s von Brumowski piloted aircraft on behalf of the conservative Heimwehr militia. During the brief Austrian Civil War in 1934 he flew several reconnaissance missions as well as a single combat sortie.

On 3 June 1936, he died in a plane crash while instructing a Dutch student at Schiphol Airfield, in the Netherlands. His life was summarized thus by his daughter: "He was a very unique and interesting person either very much loved, or hated, and even considered crazy by many."

Awards and decorations
 Order of the Iron Crown, 3rd class, with War Decoration
 Knight's Cross of the Order of Leopold with War Decorations and Swords
 Gold and Silver Bravery Medal for Officers
 Silver Military Merit Medal
 Bronze Military Merit Medal
 Iron Cross of 1914, 2nd class

List of aerial victories
See also Aerial victory standards of World War I

Confirmed victories are numbered. Victories marked "u/c" were unconfirmed.

Citations

References

1889 births
1936 deaths
People from Wadowice
Austro-Hungarian World War I flying aces
Austrian monarchists
Austro-Hungarian Air Service personnel
Aviators killed in aviation accidents or incidents
Recipients of the Medal for Bravery (Austria-Hungary)
Recipients of the Iron Cross (1914), 2nd class
Victims of aviation accidents or incidents in 1936